Seattle is the most populous municipality in the U.S. state of Washington.

Seattle or Seatle may also refer to:

Seattle
Chief Seattle (c. 1786–1866), Native American leader for whom the city was named
Seattle University, a Jesuit Catholic university in the city
Seattle Redhawks, their varsity sports teams
Seattle–Tacoma International Airport

Music
Seattle (album), a 1969 album by Perry Como
"Seattle" (song), a 1968 song composed by Hugo Montenegro, later covered by Perry Como
"Seattle", a 2009 song by The Brighton Port Authority from I Think We're Gonna Need a Bigger Boat
"Seattle", a 2008 track by Avishai Cohen from Gently Disturbed
"Hello Seattle", a 2007 song by Owl City from Of June and Ocean Eyes
"Seattle", a 1987 single by Public Image Limited from Happy?

Ships
MS Seattle, a German cargo ship that sank during World War II
USS Seattle (ACR-11), a Tennessee-class armored cruiser launched in 1905 as Washington and renamed in 1916
USS Seattle (AOE-3), a Sacramento-class fast combat support ship launched in 1968
City of Seattle (steam ferry)
City of Seattle (steamship)

Other uses 
 Seatle, Cumbria, a location in England
 Dixie Seatle, a Canadian actress
 Mount Seattle, a mountain in Alaska
 Mount Seattle (Washington), a mountain in Washington state

See also